Picciola is a novel published in 1836 by Joseph-Xavier Boniface.

Story 
The book tells the story of Count Charney, a former soldier who lost his trust in man and has been jailed for conspiring against Napoleon. Charney one day discovers a plant growing between two paving stones of his cell. This plant becomes for him a distraction, then an obsession, then a passion and finally it becomes a symbol of life and love. Through the physiological development of the plant he calls Picciola he learns to love and appreciate beauty through this real example of the evolution of nature. The image of a small flower that grows and survives with the care provided by Charney in a place so sinister as a prison, is an image of the force of nature and persistence. Charney follows the example of the flower and seeks to enrich his mind and soul amidst the walls that imprison him.

Characters 
 Count Charles Véramont de Charney
 Ludovic, the jailer
 Girhardi, another prisoner 
 Teresa, Girhardi's daughter
 Picciola, the flower
 Napoléon 1er
 Joséphine

Other media
 Robert Braithwaite Martineau

1836 French novels
Novels set in France